Lippens may refer to:

People with the surname
 Danny Lippens (born 1961), Belgian racing cyclist
 Hippolyte Lippens (1847–1906), Belgian lawyer, businessman, politician
 Martin Lippens (1934-2016), Belgian football player
 Maurice Lippens (governor) (1875–1956), former governor of Belgian Congo
 Maurice Lippens (businessman) (born 1943), Belgian businessman, grandson of the governor
 Willi Lippens (born 1945), German-Dutch football player

Other
Lippens (mango), a mango cultivar that originated in south Florida
9640 Lippens, a main-belt asteroid